Shahrak-e Hangam (also Romanized as Shahrak-e Hangām; also known as Hangām) is a village in Hangam Rural District, in the Central District of Qir and Karzin County, Fars Province, Iran. At the 2006 census, its population was 1,520, in 325 families.

References 

Populated places in Qir and Karzin County